Tsentralny District may refer to:
Tsentralny District, Minsk, a city district of Minsk, Belarus
Tsentralny District, Russia, name of several districts and city districts in Russia
Tsentralnyi District, name of several city districts in Ukraine

See also
 Tsentralny (disambiguation)